The 1994 Daily Mirror/Sporting Life Greyhound Derby took place during May and June with the final being held on 25 June 1994 at Wimbledon Stadium. The winner Moral Standards received £50,000. The competition was sponsored by the Sporting Life and Daily Mirror.

Final result 
At Wimbledon (over 480 metres):

Distances 
1¼, ½, short head, 1½, 1½ (lengths)
The distances between the greyhounds are in finishing order and shown in lengths. One length is equal to 0.08 of one second.

Competition Report
 Leading contenders for the 1994 Derby included Pall Mall Stakes champion and 1993 finalist Lassa Java and Scottish Greyhound Derby finalist Moral Standards. In round one Moral Standards won in 28.52 and Westmead Chick recorded 28.57. Round two passed with all of the main contenders remaining unbeaten and it was not until the third round that Pearls Girl, Parquet Paddy and Noir Banjo were all eliminated. Moral Standards, Ayr Flyer, track record holder Greenane Squire and Up the Junction all remained unbeaten but Lassa Java sustained a broken hock. Moral Standards became the peoples favourite due to his style of running with late finishes and winning races when it looked impossible to do so.

During the quarter-finals Moaning Lad won again in a fast 28.41 handing a first defeat to Ayr Flyer and Greenane Squire inflicted a first defeat on Up the Junction. Moral Standards and Long Valley Manor also won but Westmead Chick, Westmead Merlin and Ballinderry Sue failed to go any further.

In the first semifinal the sole remaining Irish entry Up The Junction (an odds on favourite) led from Flag The Fawn until close to the finishing line when Moral Standards then made his trademark finish to clinch a late win. The second semi ended with favourite Greenane Squire missing out on the final after Ayr Flyer won from Callahow Daly and Moaning Lad.

In the final Moral Standards won again repeating the feat of racing through the field to win in every round. The greyhound owned by Jim Wenman and John Jefford, was in trap two in the final and he was well backed into 9-4f. The traps lifted with Ayr Flyer and Up the Junction challenging for the lead with Moral Standards sat behind them in third place. Moral Standards then came from behind again to claim a second consecutive Derby for trainer Tony Meek.

The Derby champion was then sold in September to Nottingham owner Terry Corden for a reputed £50,000.

Quarter-finals

Semifinals

See also
1994 UK & Ireland Greyhound Racing Year

References

Greyhound Derby
English Greyhound Derby